Thomas Spofford (d. 1456) was a medieval Bishop of Hereford and Abbot of St Mary's Abbey, York.

Early life
Spofford was probably born in Spofforth, West Riding of Yorkshire, in the 1370s. He entered the Benedictine order at the abbey of St Mary's in York in 1392 and was elected as its abbot on 8 June 1405. He became visitor of the Benedictines in York province, and proctor of the province and the archbishop at the Council of Pisa in 1409. He was one of Henry V's ambassadors to the Council of Constance in 1414. In November 1417 he was one of the six English members of the conclave that elected Pope Martin V. 

He was nominated by the Pope to the position of Bishop of Hereford on 18 November 1421 and consecrated on 24 May 1422. He went on pilgrimage to Rome in 1429 but mainly remained in Hereford. He twice petitioned King Henry VI and two popes to be allowed to resign his position. He resigned his see about 4 December 1448.

References

Bishops of Hereford
15th-century English Roman Catholic bishops
Abbots of St Mary's, York